Sodium lauroyl sarcosinate (INCI), also known as sarcosyl, is an anionic surfactant derived from sarcosine used as a foaming and cleansing agent in shampoo, shaving foam, toothpaste, and foam wash products.

This surfactant is amphiphilic due to the hydrophobic 12-carbon chain (lauroyl) and the hydrophilic carboxylate. Since the nitrogen atom is in an amide linkage, the nitrogen is not pH active and is neutrally charged in all aqueous solutions regardless of pH. The carboxylate has a pKa of about 3.6 and is therefore negatively charged in solutions of pH greater than about 5.5.

pH-sensitive vesicles can be prepared using this surfactant with another cationic or water-insoluble amphiphiles such as 1-decanol.

Addition of an mixture of equal parts of sodium lauroyl sarcosinate and the non-ionic surfactant sorbitan monolaurate (S20) to water led to the formation of micelle-like aggregates, even though neither surfactant formed micelles when present alone.  Such aggregates can help carry other small molecules, such as drugs, through the skin.

In culture
Sodium lauroyl sarcosinate was sold as a special ingredient called "Gardol" in Colgate "Dental Cream", as toothpaste was then called, during the 1950s
through the mid-1960s in the US
and the mid-1970s in France.
Its current use as a preventive dentifrice is in Arm & Hammer Baking Soda Toothpaste, a Church & Dwight product, where it is used as a surfactant.

References

External links
"Occupational Allergic Contact Dermatitis From Sodium Lauroyl Sarcosinate in Liquid Soap," Zemtsov, Alexander MD, MSC; Fett, Deborah MD, Dermatitis, June 2005, Volume 16, Issue 2, p. 97

Cosmetics chemicals
Household chemicals
Organic sodium salts
Anionic surfactants